USA Rugby (officially the United States of America Rugby Football Union, Ltd.) is the national governing body for the sport of rugby union in the United States. Its role is to achieve and maintain “high levels of quality in all aspects of rugby." USA Rugby is responsible for the promotion and development of the sport in the U.S., and promotion of U.S. international participation.

USA Rugby was founded in 1975 as the United States of America Rugby Football Union, and it organized the first U.S. national team match in 1976. Today, USA Rugby has over 130,000 members, the largest segment being college rugby with over 32,000 members. USA Rugby oversees 1,200 high school teams, 900 college teams, 700 senior club teams, and 400 youth teams. It administers all United States national teams: senior men's and women's teams, sevens teams for both men and women, and under-20 national teams for both sexes. The organization also sponsors college rugby for both sexes, although since the 2010–11 academic year the NCAA has designated women's rugby an emerging varsity sport.

USA Rugby is governed by an 11-member Board of Directors and four National Councils across Youth & High School, College, Senior Club and International Athlete, and its  CEO is Ross Young. It is a member of World Rugby through membership with Rugby Americas North, and a member of the United States Olympic Committee. The headquarters for USA Rugby is located in Glendale, Colorado.

History

The U.S. men's national team, the Eagles, won the Gold Medal in Olympic rugby in 1920 and 1924.  After that time, rugby in the U.S. stagnated while continuing to grow in other parts of the world.

Beginning in the 1960s and continuing through the 1970s, the sport of rugby union enjoyed a renaissance in the US. This created the need for a national governing body to represent the United States. On June 7, 1975, four territorial organizations (Pacific Coast, West, Midwest, and East) gathered in Chicago, Illinois, and formed the United States of America Rugby Football Union (now known as USA Rugby). USA Rugby then fielded its first national team on January 31, 1976, in a match against Australia in Anaheim, California, which Australia won, 24–12.

In 1993, the Southern California RFU, a local area union of the Pacific Coast RFU, applied to become a separate territory. This was an impetus for others around the country to do the same, changing the make-up of USA Rugby, which now has seven territories (Pacific, Southern California, West, Midwest, South, Northeastern, and Mid-Atlantic).

USA Rugby lobbied for several years for participation in the IRB Sevens World Series. It was finally awarded the annual USA Sevens tournament, beginning in 2004 with Los Angeles as the venue for the initial USA Sevens tournaments. In summer 2006, the tournament was moved to Petco Park in San Diego. Since 2010, the tournament has been held every year at Sam Boyd Stadium in Las Vegas Valley and has been broadcast live on NBC.

USA Rugby is a Founding Sports Partner of the Sports Museum of America, joining more than 50 other single-sport Halls of Fame, national governing bodies, museums, and other organizations across North America, to celebrate the history, grandeur, and significance of sports in American culture. Opened in New York City on May 7, 2008, the Sports Museum of America showcases USA Rugby in its Hall of Halls Gallery, in return for their support of the creation of the nation's first all-sports museum experience.

In 2014, USA Rugby created Rugby International Marketing, a for-profit company that is responsible for promoting the sport of rugby.

Recent achievements
 In the 2009–10 Sevens World Series, the men's sevens team finished the season ranked 10th in the world, their highest ranking to date at that time.
 In 2010, USA Rugby became an Olympic Sport member of the United States Olympic Committee (USOC).
 In 2011, the International Rugby Board, now known as World Rugby, gave its Development Award to USA Rugby for its Rookie Rugby program that introduced over 100,000 new children to youth rugby.
 In 2014:
 the U.S. Women's Sevens finished 4th in the World Rugby Women's Sevens World Series, their highest finish to date. 
 the U.S. vs New Zealand match sold out Soldier Field in Chicago, drawing over 60,000 fans and setting a U.S. attendance record.
 In 2015:
 USA Rugby won the bid to host the 2018 Rugby World Cup Sevens in the San Francisco Bay Area.
 the U.S. Men'Sevens team finished sixth in the 2014–15 Sevens World Series, including first at the 2015 London Sevens. The team also defeated Canada 21–5 to win the 2015 NACRA Sevens and qualify for the 2016 Summer Olympics.
 In 2017:
 the Women's U.S. National Team finished 4th at the Women's Rugby World Cup in Ireland. Their second highest finish since winning the 1991 tournament.
 the U.S. Men's Sevens team finished fifth in the 2016-17 World Rugby Sevens Series, their highest-ever finish.
 In 2018: 
 the U.S. Men's National Team won the America's Rugby Championship (ARC) for the second consecutive year.
 the United States hosted its first ever Rugby World Cup event with the Rugby World Cup Sevens 2018 in San Francisco at AT&T Park. The event welcomed more than 100,000 in attendance, setting the mark for highest attended Rugby World Cup Sevens to date.
 In October 2021, the U.S. vs New Zealand (All Blacks) match at FedEx Field in Washington DC. The final score was 104-14 to the All Blacks.

Governance and leadership
USA Rugby is governed by its board of directors and its congress.  The board is composed of 11 members: 4 independent directors, 4 international athletes, and 3 representatives from USA Rugby's National Councils across Youth, College ,and Adult Club.  Board members as of 2020 were: 

 Tom Cusack (Chairperson)
 Michael Garner
 Koma Gandy
 Denis Shanagher
 Al Lucas
 Bill Stevens
 Michele Yarbrough
 Jamie Burke
 Michael Crafton 
 Brett Thompson
 Victoria Folayan

Gary Gold began his tenure as the head coach of the men's national team on January 1, 2018. 
Mike Friday is the head coach of the men's national sevens team. Rob Cain was appointed as the Women's Eagles head coach in May 2018. Chris Brown is the head coach of the Women's Sevens team, who ranked 2nd in the world through the 2018-19 Women's World Rugby Sevens Series.

International representation
USA Rugby became a member of the International Rugby Football Board in 1987. The worldwide body would become the International Rugby Board (IRB) in 1998 and World Rugby in 2014. USA Rugby does not hold a vote on WR's 28-member Executive Council—the majority of votes are held by the 8 founding nations—although NACRA members collectively hold one vote on the Executive Council.  In December 2011, for the first time, USA Rugby placed a representative on the 10-man executive committee. Bob Latham, in his role as chair of Rugby Americas North (RAN; known as NACRA before 2016), represents RAN on the executive committee.

USA Rugby also has relationships with international multi-sport organizations.  USA Rugby is a member of the U.S. Olympic Committee and interacts with the International Olympic Committee.  USA Rugby also interacts with the Pan American Sport Organization, and rugby has been a sport at the Pan Am Games since 2011.

Financials
USA Rugby generally earns between $8 million to $16 million in annual revenues, with the majority of the revenue coming from: (1) membership dues, (2) event revenue, (3) grants, and (4) sponsorship.  Their principal expenses are: (1) High Performance, (2) Men's National Team, and (3) Marketing and Fundraising.  In 2010, USA Rugby paid over $200,000 each to its CEO Nigel Melville and its then head coach Eddie O'Sullivan. As of 2012, Nigel Melville's compensation was $250,000. USA Rugby experienced a financial crunch in 2016–17, due to the bankruptcy of kit sponsor BLK and currency exchange rates that affect grants received from World Rugby.

USA Rugby lost more than $4.4 million in 2017, and $4.2 million in 2018. Most of the losses were attributed to USA Rugby Partners, formerly known as Rugby International Marketing (RIM), which was the majority owner of The Rugby Channel which was sold in 2018 to FloSports. In early 2020, with the outbreak of coronavirus, USA Rugby filed for Chapter 11 bankruptcy to develop a financial restructuring plan. USA finished the Chapter 11 bankruptcy process as the Delaware Bankruptcy Court approved USA Rugby's debtor plan and the sport's National Governing Body. On September 1, 2020, USA Rugby was reorganized and started paying back creditors.

USA Rugby annual revenues are below, along with the components that generated the majority of revenue:

Notes: 
 Grants come mainly from World Rugby and from the United States Olympic Committee.

Board performance 
In a February 2017 assembly, Board Chair Will Chang called for a vote of confidence in the board from USA Rugby's Congress, which passed by a vote of 43–1. Steve Lewis, the sole Congress member who voted no confidence in the board, cited three issues — RIM's performance, the sanctioning of the PRO Rugby competition, and overspending by the high performance department. With RIM's financial performance continuing to deteriorate, in August 2017, Lewis proposed what was effectively a vote of no confidence in the board, this time getting seven votes and a similar number of abstentions. RIM's product “The Rugby Channel”, which was supposed to be a money maker for USA Rugby, finished 2017 with $4.2 million in losses for the year.

Bankruptcy
On March 31, 2020, the board of USA Rugby voted to file for Chapter 11 bankruptcy as a result of "insurmountable financial constraints" in the wake of the coronavirus pandemic crisis. On August 31, 2020, the Delaware Bankruptcy Court approved USA Rugby's plan to reimburse its bankruptcy debts owed to creditors over five years effective the following day, allowing the governing body to exit bankruptcy and enter the post-bankruptcy phase.

National teams: The Eagles
USA Rugby is responsible for organizing the various US national teams:

Men's teams
 U.S. national rugby union team — (Men's Eagles) competes annually every August/September in the Americas Rugby Championship, hosts matches during the June internationals, and usually travels to Europe to play in the November internationals. The team also competes every four years at the Rugby World Cup.
 U.S. national rugby sevens team — (Men's Eagles Sevens) competes annually in the World Rugby Sevens Series, a 10-tournament series that runs from December through June each year. The U.S. sevens team has finished in the top six in each of the three seasons from 2014/15 to 2017/18. The national sevens team also competes every four years in the Pan American Games, the Rugby Sevens World Cup, and in qualifying for the Summer Olympics. 
 U.S. national under-20 rugby union team — competes annually to qualify for either the World Rugby Under 20 Championship or the World Rugby Under 20 Trophy.

Women's teams
 U.S. women's national rugby union team — (Women's Eagles) competes every four years in the Women's Rugby World Cup. The national women's team had early success in the World Cup, reaching the finals in each of the first three tournaments (1991, 1994, 1998), but has not reached the semifinals since then.
 U.S. women's national rugby sevens team — (Women's Eagles Sevens) competes in the World Rugby Women's Sevens Series, and have finished in the top six each season since the inaugural series season in 2012-13.
 United States national under-20 rugby union team — competes annually, most notably with rival nation to the north, Canada in exhibition tournaments.

Professional rugby

The Professional Rugby Organization, known as PRO Rugby, was an American professional rugby union competition that played in 2016. This was the first professional rugby competition in North America. PRO played only the 2016 season, before it ceased operations as of January 2017.

Major League Rugby, another professional competition, was founded in late 2017. It began play in 2018 with seven teams, all in the U.S., and expanded to nine teams for the 2019 season, with one of the new teams in Canada. 2020 was expected to see 12 teams with East and West divisions.

While not yet professional, the top domestic competition for women's rugby in the US is the Women's Premier League (WPL) with 10 teams. The league completed its 10th season in 2020.

Club competitions

USA Rugby hosts two national championships in the club space. The Club National Championships in early June along with the Club 7s National Championship in mid August.

Rugby Super League, organized and sanctioned by USA Rugby, was the premier national level of men's club competition in the US. It was founded in 1996, but ended play as of 2012 following the Great Recession. Following the demise of the Super League, the Pacific Rugby Premiership was formed in 2013, and began play in 2014 as the top level of men's club competition in the U.S.

The USA Rugby club structure sees the United States divided into two leagues: West and East.
Within each league there are four conferences, with the winners of each conference's division advancing to the league semifinals, and the two league champions competing in the national championship.

East: Atlantic North, Mid-Atlantic, Midwest, Southern

West: Pacific North, Pacific South, Frontier, Red River

College rugby

USA Rugby hosts 5 total championship competitions annually. The Men's Division 1-A, Women's D1 Elite, Spring College, Fall College and College 7s Championships.

The Collegiate Rugby Championship is a rugby sevens competition that has been held every year in June since 2010. The tournament is the highest profile college rugby tournament in the U.S., and is broadcast live on NBC every year from PPL Park in the Philadelphia metropolitan area. Every year, the number of spectators increase, and in 2015 the College Rugby Championship broke an attendance record at over 24,000 spectators, which shows how the popularity of the sport is expanding.

State Governing Bodies 
State Governing Bodies are responsible for developing an administrative structure with the objective of promoting the development of youth rugby within their state. They are also responsible for day-to-day governance, including organizing league structures, collecting dues, implementing a state championship, and conducting rugby outreach. USA Rugby has 44 state rugby organizations.

Hall of Fame

World Rugby Hall of Fame

The following have been inducted into the World Rugby Hall of Fame:

U.S. Rugby Hall of Fame

To date, 68 individuals and three teams who have made a lasting impression on rugby in the United States, have been inducted into the U.S. Rugby Hall of Fame. For full bios of all the inductees and for more information about the U.S. Rugby Hall of Fame, visit: usrugbyhalloffame.org.

Coaching
USA Rugby oversees coaching and referee development of the game.  USA Rugby requires coaches and referees to register and complete a number of certification courses depending on the level of play.

Geographical unions
USA Rugby organizes amateur registered rugby teams into thirteen geographical unions at the senior club level. High school and youth teams affiliate with State Rugby Organizations while college teams register with either Geographical Unions or College Conferences.

The current Geographical Unions are:

 Capital (Maryland, Virginia, Washington, D.C.)
 Carolinas
 Eastern Penn (also covers Delaware and South Jersey)
 Empire (New York, southern Connecticut and northern New Jersey)
 Florida (excludes most of the Panhandle)
 Mid-America (Arkansas, Kansas, Missouri, Nebraska, Oklahoma, and parts of Illinois)
 New England
 Northern California (also covers all of Nevada outside of the Las Vegas Valley)
 Pacific Northwest (Idaho, Oregon, Washington)
Rocky Mountain (Colorado, Utah, Wyoming, and western South Dakota)
 Southern California (also covers Arizona, New Mexico, and the Las Vegas Valley)
 Texas (also covers most of Arkansas and Louisiana)
 True South (Alabama, Louisiana, Mississippi, Tennessee, and the Florida Panhandle)

The following states are not currently covered by a geographic union:

 Georgia
 Illinois
 Indiana
 Iowa
 Kentucky
 Michigan
 Minnesota
 Montana
 North Dakota
 Ohio
 West Virginia
 Wisconsin
 In addition, Western Pennsylvania is not covered by a geographic union.

Past leaders

Elected governance history

In June 1987, the position of Chairman of the Board was added to the executive committee, and Bob Watkins was named to that position. Effective June 1989, that position was retitled Post of Past President, and remained an appointed post until the position was dropped in 1996.

Effective January 1996, an executive vice president was added.

Effective March 2000, the Vice President was replaced with Athlete Vice President.

Effective April 2004, the President title was replace with Chairman, and an USARRA Representative was added.

Effective July 14, 2006, the governance was changed to a model with a board of directors nominated and approved by a congress.

National office
The governing body of USA Rugby opened a national office on June 3, 1988. The office has been headed by:

See also

 Americas Rugby Championship
 Churchill Cup (defunct)
 Rugby union in the United States
 Sports broadcasting contracts in the United States#Rugby
 Super Powers Cup (defunct)
 United States at the Rugby World Cup
 USA Rugby Sevens Collegiate National Championships

References

External links
 

 
Rugby union governing bodies in North America
Sports organizations established in 1975
United States
Companies that filed for Chapter 11 bankruptcy in 2020